Visiting friends and relatives (VFR tourism / VFR travel) is a substantial form of travel worldwide. 

One definition put forward has been "VFR travel is a form of travel involving a visit whereby either (or both) the purpose of the trip or the type of accommodation involves visiting friends and / or relatives"   This has subsequently been developed into a VFR definitional model to describe it visually.

VFR expenditures tend to be quite broad; spread widely throughout the community rather than confined to the narrow tourism sector (McKercher, 1995). In some expenditure categories, VFR travellers have been shown to outspend non-VFR travellers (Seaton & Palmer, 1997; Morrison, Verginis et al., 2000)

References

Types of tourism
Types of travel
Friendship